Randal MacDonnell, 1st Marquess of Antrim may refer to:

Randal MacDonnell, 1st Marquess of Antrim (1645 creation) (1609–1683), Roman Catholic landed magnate in Scotland and Ireland, son of the 1st Earl of Antrim
Randal MacDonnell, 1st Marquess of Antrim (1789 creation) (1749–1791)